Kloostri River is a river in Harju County, Estonia. The river is 36.9 km long and basin size is 91.7 km2. It runs into Gulf of Finland.

References

Rivers of Estonia
Harju County